Lucie Hradecká and Michaëlla Krajicek were the defending champions, but Hradecká chose not to participate this year. Krajicek played alongside Karolína Plíšková, but lost in the quarterfinals to Belinda Bencic and Kateřina Siniaková.

Bencic and Siniaková went on to win the title, defeating Kateryna Bondarenko and Eva Hrdinová in the final, 6–2, 6–2.

Seeds

Draw

Draw

References 
 Main draw

Prague Open - Doubles
WTA Prague Open